The 10th Pan American Junior Athletics Championships were held in Tampa, Florida, on July 9–11, 1999.

Participation (unofficial)

Detailed result lists can be found on the CFPI and on the "World Junior Athletics History" website.  An unofficial count yields the number of about 330 athletes from about 29 countries:  Antigua and Barbuda (3), Argentina (6), Bahamas (11), Barbados (8), Bermuda (1), Belize (1), Brazil (18), British Virgin Islands (2), Canada (61), Cayman Islands (3), Chile (20), Colombia (7), Costa Rica (1), Dominica (2), Ecuador (4), El Salvador (2), Grenada (4), Guatemala (5), Guyana (2), Jamaica (32), Mexico (13), Panama (1), Peru (4), Puerto Rico (12), Trinidad and Tobago (8), Turks and Caicos Islands (10), United States (78), U.S. Virgin Islands (2), Venezuela (9).

Medal summary

Medal winners are published.
Complete results can be found on the CFPI and the on the "World Junior Athletics History" website.

Men

Women

Medal table (unofficial)

References

External links
World Junior Athletics History

Pan American U20 Athletics Championships
1999 in American sports
Pan American U20 Championships
International track and field competitions hosted by the United States
1999 in youth sport
1999 in sports in Florida